The Primorsky Partisans were a group of six young men who waged a guerrilla war against the Russian police, who have long been accused of corruption and brutality.

History

From the small village of Kirovsky in Primorsky Krai, Russia's Far East they had long had encounters with the police they described as brutal, and degrading. The group decided on a violent solution to the appalling conditions with the police and waged a campaign against them including shooting traffic policemen, raiding a police station, and stabbing a police officer to death. The police began a large scale manhunt and the Partisans were tracked down to a flat belonging to one of the members 17 miles from the Chinese border, in Kirovsky. Before the shoot out began they posted a video on YouTube describing their motives. 

As about a dozen militsiya officers and OMON troops approached, two of the four occupants opened fire with pistols, wounding two police officers. The police were later joined by a platoon of internal troops with BTR armored vehicles. After negotiations lasting five hours, two committed suicide, and the other two surrendered. This created a storm of controversy in Russia, as many Russians sympathized with the Partisans, and resented the police. 

In a non-scientific poll by the popular radio station Echo of Moscow, 75% of responders said they viewed the Partisans as Robin Hoods, and 66% stated they would shelter the Partisans if given the chance. Nationalist politician Vladimir Zhirinovsky voiced his support for the Primorsky Partisans at a session of the State Duma.

On July 20, 2016 the jury trial came up with an acquittal verdict for all members following the second trial. Their guilt for committing the mass murder and creating an organized crime group was not proved. Vadim Kovtun and Alexei Nikitin were immediately set free. The rest of the Partisans remain behind bars, being accused of other crimes.

Members
Aleksandr Kovtun, leader of the group. His brother Vadim Kovtun was also arrested and charged with aiding and abetting, although not as part of the group.
Andrei Sukhorada (July 25, 1987 – June 11, 2010) former member of National Bolshevik Party. On March 3, 2004, Sukhorada was arrested when police raided a group of National Bolsheviks who were staging an occupation of the United Russia Party HQ in Moscow. Eduard Limonov alleged that Sukhorada implied to him he'd carry out violent militant acts in his native region.
Aleksandr Sladkikh (September 18, 1989 – June 11, 2010)
Vladimir Ilyutikov
Roman Savchenko 
Maksim Kirilov
Alexei Nikitin, arrested on July 31, 2010 as a supposed abettor.

Motivation
On October 9, 2010, a 13-minute video entitled "Video Appeal of the Primorsky Partisans" was released on YouTube. In the video the partizans of the group declared a guerrilla war against corruption and Russian Militsiya. The video was removed from the YouTube server several times due to complaints.

Reaction
A poll of listeners to the Echo of Moscow radio station indicated that 60–75 percent of listeners sympathised with the Primorsky Partisans and would offer them help.

See also
Petr Pavlensky

Explanatory notes

References

External links

Why Russians backed anti-police rage - article on BBC
CC: The Primorsky Partisans 25 Nov 10
Radio Free Europe/Radio Liberty (RFE/RL) 
Crossing Continents: The Primorsky Partisans 
 Francis of Assisi and the Primorsky Partisans interview with artist Josef Zacek (RFE/RL)14 September 2011
Police in Russia's Far East Corner 'Robin Hood' Gang, Killing Two
 Jan Machonin Too Creative Dissident A2 16/ 2016

2010 crimes in Russia
2010 in Russia
Primorsky Krai
Guerrilla organizations
Human rights abuses in Russia
Paramilitary organizations based in Russia
Politics of Russia
Terrorism in Russia